The 1982 Seiko Super Tennis, also known as the Tokyo Indoor was a men's tennis tournament played on indoor carpet courts at the Yoyogi National Stadium in Tokyo, Japan that was part of the 1982 Volvo Grand Prix circuit. It was the fifth edition of the tournament and was held from 25 October through 29 October 1982. Matches were the best of three sets. First-seeded John McEnroe won the singles title without the loss of a set and earned $60,000 first-prize money.

Finals

Singles

 John McEnroe defeated  Peter McNamara 7–6(8–6), 7–5
 It was McEnroe's 4th singles title of the year and the 38th of his career.

Doubles

 Tim Gullikson /  Tom Gullikson defeated  John McEnroe /  Peter Rennert 6–4, 3–6, 7–6

Notes

References

External links
 ITF tournament edition details

Tokyo Indoor
1982 in Japanese tennis
Tokyo Indoor